Jo Marie Lewis  (born 11 December 1993) is a Trinidadian footballer who plays as a forward for the Trinidad and Tobago women's national football team. She was part of the team at the 2016 CONCACAF Women's Olympic Qualifying Tournament. On club level she plays for St Ann's FC in Trinidad and Tobago.

International goals
Scores and results list Trinidad and Tobago' goal tally first.

References

External links
 

1993 births
Living people
Women's association football forwards
Trinidad and Tobago women's footballers
Place of birth missing (living people)
Trinidad and Tobago women's international footballers
Competitors at the 2014 Central American and Caribbean Games